Yemelyan Mikhailovich Yaroslavsky (born Minei Izrailevich Gubelman, Мине́й Изра́илевич Губельма́н;  – 4 December 1943) was a Bolshevik revolutionary, Communist Party functionary, journalist and historian.

An atheist and anti-religious polemicist, Yaroslavsky served as editor of the atheist satirical magazine Bezbozhnik (The Godless) and led the League of the Militant Godless organization. Yaroslavsky also headed the Anti-Religious Committee of the Central Committee. In his book How Gods and Goddesses Are Born, Live, and Die (1923), Yaroslavsky argued that religion was born under man, lived under man, and would die under communism.

Biography

Early years

Yemelyan Yaroslavsky was born on 3 March 1878, into a Jewish family as Minei Israilevich Gubelman in Chita, then the capital of Russia's Transbaikal Oblast, where his parents were political exiles. His first job was as a bookbinder.

Yaroslavsky joined the Russian Social Democratic Workers Party in 1898 and organized party cells on the Trans-Baikal (Zabaikalsky) Railroad. In 1901, he was a correspondent for the revolutionary newspaper "Iskra," and the following year became a member of the Party's Chita Committee. In 1903 he was arrested and put under police surveillance, but absconded to St. Petersburg Committee of the Russian Social Democratic Labour Party and a leader of its military wing, siding with the Social Democrats' Bolshevik faction during the intraparty split. He was arrested in April 1904, and spent eight months in prison, but was released on the outbreak of 1905 Revolution. During that year, he was an agitator in St Petersburg, Odessa, Tula, and Yaroslavl. In Odessa, he was arrested and spent four months in prison. In Yaroslavl, he organised a textile workers' strike – hence his pseudonym Yaroslavsky.

First wife 

In 1903, Yaroslavsky married Olga Mikhailovna Genkina, a 21 year old student at the Women's Medical Institute in St Petersburg, from which she was expelled after being caught in possession of revolutionary literature in February 1904. In 1905, the party sent her to Nizhny Novgorod, to organise textile workers. She was arrested but released when the crowd stormed the jail. The party then sent her to Ivanovo-Vosnesensk in November 1905, but she was intercepted at the station by the Black Hundreds, and killed. She was 24.

Party career in 1906–1921 

Yaroslavsky was a delegate to the party conferences in Tammerfors in December 1905, Stockholm, in April 1906, and London, June 1907. After his return from London, he was arrested, held for 18 months, then sentenced to five years hard labour in the Gorny Zerentu Prison in the Nerchinsk region. When he had completed his sentence, in 1912, he was exiled to Eastern Siberia.

After the February revolution in 1917, he returned to Moscow, to edit a Bolshevik newspaper. In the months after the October Revolution of 1917, Yaroslavsky became associated with the Left Communist tendency, which opposed the negotiated settlement of military hostilities with the invading army of the German empire. Early in the Russian Civil War, he was a political commissar with the Red Army in Moscow. He supported the 'Military Opposition', who objected to the strategy deployed by the People' Commissar for War Leon Trotsky, which relied on professional army officers and set-piece battles, rather than guerilla tactics. The opposition is presumed to have been indirectly encouraged by Trotsky's rival, Josif Stalin. Later, Yaroslavsky was transferred to party organisation in Perm and Omsk. He was named a candidate member of the governing Central Committee of the Bolshevik Party in 1919 as a candidate member.

Party Secretary 

Yaroslavsky's influence peaked in March 1921, after he had backed Lenin against Trotsky in a dispute over the role of trade unions. He was appointed one of three secretaries of the Central Committee of the Communist Party of the Soviet Union (Bolshevik) (CPSU {B}), and raised to full membership of that body. The senior secretary was Vyacheslav Molotov. Many years later, Molotov complained: "One moment, Yaroslavsky would request trousers for one person, another time it would be shoes for someone else. Trifles. True, the times were such that people were in need of everything. But attention had to be focused on major problems."

Molotov complained to Lenin, who had Yaroslavsky transferred to Siberia. On September 15, 1921, Yaroslavsky was the prosecutor at the trial in Novonikolaevsk, now Novosibirsk, of the counter-revolutionary Lieutenant General Roman von Ungern-Sternberg. However, he was back in Moscow in December 1921 for a party conference, at which - to Trotsky's lasting annoyance - he arranged that Grigory Zinoviev was billed as second in seniority to Lenin, with Trotsky third. He held the title of Central Committee secretary until April 1922, when Josif Stalin was appointed General Secretary, with Molotov as his deputy. Yaroslavsky retained his Central Committee membership until 1923 but never held a position as important as that of a party secretary.

Atheist activist

Late in 1922, Yaroslavsky created a new role for himself, as the Soviet Union's foremost anti-religious propagandist. He performed this function for nearly two decades, until the German invasion of the USSR when Stalin turned to the Russian Orthodox church for help in the war effort.

In the fall of 1922, the Central Committee of the Russian Communist Party established a new standing committee, the "Committee on the Execution of the Decree Separating Church and State" (unofficially known as the "Anti-Religious Commission"), granted "full authority in general leadership and policy in regard to religion and the church and development of party directives on issues of anti-religious propaganda." Although a body of limited power, the Anti-Religious Commission marked the first step towards an official Bolshevik policy of systematic religious extermination and anti-religious propaganda.

Trotsky claimed that Yarosalvsky was put in charge of this campaign while Lenin was absent through illness and that when he returned he rebuked Molotov for sanctioning it, saying: "Don't you know what Yaroslavsky is? It's enough to make a chicken laugh. He will never be able to manage this work."

Yaroslavsky's chaired the Militant League of the Godless, and edited its principle journal Bezbozhnik. At different times, he also edited other anti-religious periodicals.

Role in party disputes 

In April 1923, Yaroslavsky was appointed Secretary of the Central Control Commission, the committee in charge of party discipline, and a member of the directing collegium of the Workers' and Peasants' Inspectorate (Rabkrin), a closely related monitoring agency which extended its purview outside of the party into the economic sphere. Over the course of his career as a Communist Party functionary, Yaroslavsky sat on the boards of several leading Soviet publications, including the Communist Party daily Pravda and the party theoretical journal Bolshevik.

He backed Stalin in all the factional disputes within the communist party that followed Lenin's incapacity and death. He appears to have been the first prominent communist to attack Trotsky personally, during a meeting of the Moscow party organisation, for which he was heckled by part of his audience. When Trotsky addressed the Central Committee for the last time in October 1927, before his expulsion, while others barracked and insulted him, Yaroslavsky threw a heavy book at his head.

In December 1925, after the rift between Stalin and Zinoviev, Yaroslavsky was part of the team sent to Leningrad to purge Zinoviev's supporters from the regional party, and made so provocative a speech that he was shouted down by Leningrad party members.

In an 8 March 1931 speech before the Communist Academy held in the aftermath of the 1931 Menshevik Trial, Yaroslavsky attacked David Riazanov, scholarly head of the Marx-Engels Institute and a former member of the Menshevik Party, for the allegedly insufficient number of Communist Party members employed at that archive and research center. Later that year the Academy would officially condemn Riazanov as "an agent of counter-revolutionary Menshevism," leading to his arrest and exile outside of the city of Moscow.

In February 1937, when the two former party leaders Nikolai Bukharin and Alexei Rykov were arraigned before the Central Committee, prior to being arrested, put on trial and executed, Yaroslavsky denounced them as treasonous, and claimed that the charges against them were "totally proven". (In 1988, it was officially admitted that they were both victims of trumped up charges).

Historian

Yaroslavsky was an early biographer of Bolshevik leader V. I. Lenin with his first biography, Velikii vozhd' rabochei revoliutsii (The Great Leader of the Workers' Revolution) seeing print in 1918 in the aftermath of a failed assassination attempt. Yaroslavsky was subsequently chosen as a member of the directorate of the Lenin Institute, an archive and research center established in 1923 to gather and publish the various letters, manuscripts, and writings of Lenin. A second and more widely distributed Lenin biography by Yaroslavsky, Zhizn' i rabota V.I. Lenina (The Life and Work of V.I. Lenin), was rushed to the press in 1924, following Lenin's death.

Yaroslavsky was also a frequent writer on the history of the Bolshevik Party and an editor of one of the main historical journals of the 1920s, Istorik-Marksist (Marxist Historian). But changes in political conditions compelled him periodically to rewrite the record.
In February 1923, Yaroslavsky wrote a long article on Trotsky's early career, covering 1900–1902, in which he declared that

The campaign to denigrate Trotsky began that same year. Writing in the 1930s, Trotsky claimed that "Yaroslavsky rose to his present position entirely by his slandering of me. As the official corrupter of the history of the party, he represents the past as an unbroken struggle of Trotsky against Lenin."

Yaroslavsky suddenly came under attack in 1931, when Stalin published an essay on the alleged mistakes made by historians and claimed that "even Comrade Yaroslavsky is not, unfortunately, an exception; his books on the history of the CPSU (B), despite all their merits, contain a number of errors in matters of principle and history." Stalin did not say what the 'errors' were, but others picked up the attack, accusing Yaroslavsky of being a Trotskyist, a Menshevik etc. He wrote several plaintive letters to Stalin but got no reply, so wrote a letter confessing to being in the wrong. He then wrote a new biography of Stalin that magnified his role in early Bolshevik history.

After the rise of Nazi Germany, and of Japanese expansionism, there was a sudden change in the demands made on historians. In the 1920s, the Soviet Union's most eminent historian had been Mikhail Pokrovsky, who had depicted Russia under the Tsars as an aggressor that persecuted smaller nations such as the Jews and Poles, and which shared the blame for the outbreak of war against France in 1812, Japan in 1905, and Germany in 1914. With the renewed threat of war, Stalin proposed to appeal to Russian nationalism and tales of military glory. In 1939, Yaroslavsky denounced Pokrovsky as a Trotskyite, saying that:

Later years

Yaroslavsky was Chairman of the Society of Old Bolsheviks in 1931 until Stalin ordered the society's dissolution in 1935. He was also the head of the Society of Former Political Prisoners and Penal Exiles, a fraternal benefit society which aided Old Bolsheviks and other political prisoners of the Tsarist era. He was a member of the Party Control Commission in 1934-39. From 1939, he was a member of the Central Committee.

With the outbreak of the German-Soviet War, in the summer of 1941, the Soviet state reduced its anti-religious activities in an effort to make use of the Russian Orthodox Church as an institution to rally the population to defend the nation. The journals Bezbozhnik and Antireligioznik ceased publication and the League of the Militant Godless fell into obscurity.

The aging Yaroslavsky, still an esteemed senior historian of the Bolshevik Party, dutifully promoted the government's new nationalistic political line, writing an article for Pravda entitled "The Bolsheviks – Continuers of the Best Patriotic Tradition of the Russian People" which declared the Bolsheviks the "lawful heirs to the Russian people's great and honorable past" and acknowledged the place of the Great Russian nationality "at the head of the other peoples of the USSR." Yaroslavsky's high-profile Pravda piece, along with a similar patriotic and nationalist article by Agitprop chief G. F. Alexandrov, was taken as an official signal to the historical profession to mine the imperial Russian past for examples of heroic unity and national defense which might be transformed into illustrative propaganda to aid the USSR in its attempt to rebuff the Nazi German invaders.

Death and legacy

Yaroslavsky died on 4 December 1943 in Moscow of stomach cancer.  His remains were cremated and the urn with his ashes was interred to the left side of the Senate Tower in the Kremlin Wall Necropolis behind Lenin's Mausoleum.

Honours and awards
 Order of Lenin (1938)
 Stalin Prize, 1st class (1943) — For the collective research work entitled "History of the Civil War," Volume 2. (1942)

Works in English
 How Gods and Goddesses are Born, Live, and Die. Moscow: Red Virgin Soil, 1923.
 Lenin: His Life and Work. Chicago: Daily Worker Publishing Co., n.d. [c. 1926].
 A Short History of the Russian Communist Party. In Two Volumes. Moscow: n.p., n.d. [1930s].
 Bolshevik Verification and Purging of the Party Ranks. Moscow: Cooperative Publishing Society of Foreign Workers in the USSR, 1933.
 Religion in the USSR. New York: International Publishers, 1934.
 History of Anarchism in Russia. New York: International Publishers, 1937.
 Meaning of the Soviet Trials. Contributor. New York: Workers Library Publishers, 1938.
 The Great Patriotic War of the Soviet People. Moscow, Foreign Languages Publishing House, 1941.
 Landmarks in the Life of Stalin. London : Lawrence & Wishart, n.d. [1942].
 Twenty-five Years of Soviet Power. London: Hutchinson & Co., 1943.

Footnotes

Further reading
 George M. Enteen, "Writing Party History in the USSR: The Case of E. M. Iaroslavskii," Journal of Contemporary History, vol. 21, no. 2 (April 1986), pp. 321–339. In JSTOR.

1878 births
1943 deaths
People from Chita, Zabaykalsky Krai
People from Transbaikal Oblast
Russian Jews
Russian Social Democratic Labour Party members
Old Bolsheviks
Central Committee of the Communist Party of the Soviet Union members
Stalinism
Anti-revisionists
Russian Constituent Assembly members
First convocation members of the Soviet of the Union
Russian atheists
Jewish atheists
Soviet Jews
Russian atheism activists
Full Members of the USSR Academy of Sciences
Recipients of the Order of Lenin
Stalin Prize winners
Burials at the Kremlin Wall Necropolis
Soviet historians
Pravda people
Deaths from stomach cancer
Deaths from cancer in the Soviet Union
Deaths from cancer in Russia